

Route 322 is a collector road in the Canadian province of Nova Scotia.

It is located in the Halifax Regional Municipality and connects southeastern Dartmouth at Trunk 7 with Cole Harbour at Route 207.

The route follows "Pleasant Street" in the former city of Dartmouth from its western terminus at the intersection with Prince Albert Road (Trunk 7) to the old Dartmouth city limit at Woodside.  From Shearwater to Eastern Passage Pleasant Street becomes "Main Road."  From that point, it follows "Cow Bay Road", "Dyke Road" and "Bissett Road" to its eastern terminus at the intersection with Route 207 (Cole Harbour Road) in Cole Harbour.

It is part of the Marine Drive scenic travelway.

Communities
Dartmouth
Eastern Passage
Cow Bay
Rainbow Haven
Cole Harbour

Images

See also
List of Nova Scotia provincial highways

References

Map of Nova Scotia

Nova Scotia provincial highways
Roads in Halifax, Nova Scotia